Jean-Racine Meissonnier (1794 – 19 August 1856), also called Meissonnier Jeune, was a French classical guitarist, musical arranger and composer, as well as an important music publisher.

Life
Born in Marseille, Meissonnier learned the guitar from his elder brother, Jean-Antoine Meissonnier (1783–1857), himself a guitarist and publisher. After he moved to the capital, he taught the instrument for a long time, before taking over the business of a music merchant, Corbaux, at 28 rue Dauphine in Paris.

He arranged many pieces, especially opera pieces, for the guitar. He also composed arias that have become classics, some of which have been published: Three Duets for guitar and violin; Three Rondeaux; Airs connus pour guitare seule, Opp. 2 and 4; Airs d'opéra variés; Contredanses. He also wrote two guitar methods.

Meissonnier invested a lot in his publishing activity, like his brother for whom he is sometimes mistaken (Fétis notes that Whistling confuses them in his general catalogue of printed music). From 1821 onwards, he was found in Paris (rue Dauphine) under the name "J. Meissonnier" until 1840, then as "Meissonnier Jeune" from 1841 to 1845, then "J. Meissonnier et fils" or "J. Meissonnier fils" from 1845 to 1860 (his son Édouard having entered the business and "made a considerable fortune" there according to Fétis.) In 1860, the Meissonnier estate was transferred to the publisher E. Gérard et Cie.

Works

Books

Arrangements (online)

Arrangements (others)
 Trois Duos, for guitar and violin (Paris: Hanry)
 Trois Rondeaux (Paris: Hanry)
 Airs connus pour guitare seule, Opp. 2 and 4 (Paris: Ph. Petit)
 Airs d'opéra variés (Paris: Hanry, Dufaut et Dubois)
 Contredanses (Paris: Hanry, Dufaut et Dubois)

References

External links
 Digitized documents from the Deutsche Digitale Bibliothek

1794 births
1856 deaths
19th-century French composers
19th-century French male musicians
Composers for the classical guitar
French classical guitarists
French male classical composers
French male guitarists
French music arrangers
French music publishers (people)
French Romantic composers
Musicians from Marseille
19th-century guitarists